was a Japanese video game software publisher and developer, established on October 1, 1996 as a division of Victor Entertainment. Their first game was Fish Eyes and their last game was Fish Eyes 3.

Some of their games used the  brand.

History
On October 1, 1996, Victor Entertainment merged with Pack-In-Video to establish Victor Interactive Software. On March 31, 2003, Victor Interactive Software was acquired by Marvelous Entertainment and became Marvelous Interactive, which was merged into Marvelous Entertainment in June 2007.

Games

Localizations

See also
JVCKenwood Victor Entertainment
Electronic Arts Victor

References

Video game development companies
Video game companies established in 1996
Defunct video game companies of Japan
Marvelous Entertainment
Victor Entertainment
JVCKenwood

ja:ビクターインタラクティブソフトウェア